Speeding Hoofs is a 1927 American silent Western film directed by Louis Chaudet and starring Dick Hatton, Elsa Benham and Ray Turner.

Cast
 Dick Hatton as Richard Stanton 
 Elsa Benham as Elsa McGuire 
 Ray Turner as Tim Washington 
 Roy Watson as Bill Travers 
 Bud Osborne as Jack Richardson 
 William Ryno as James McGuire 
 Cliff Lyons as Henchman

References

Bibliography
 Langman, Larry. A Guide to Silent Westerns. Greenwood Publishing Group, 1992.

External links
 

1927 films
1927 Western (genre) films
Films directed by Louis Chaudet
American black-and-white films
Rayart Pictures films
Silent American Western (genre) films
1920s English-language films
1920s American films